The 2012–13 Estonian Cup was the 23rd season of the Estonia's most prestigious football knockout tournament. The winner of the Cup qualifies for the first qualifying round of the 2013–14 UEFA Europa League. Flora won the competition after they defeated Kalju 3–1 in the final.

First round
The draw was made by Estonian Football Association on 26 May 2012, before the 2011–12 final of the same competition. League level of the club in the brackets. FC Helios is the only team that takes part from Rahvaliiga (RL) — a league organized by Estonian Football Association, but not part of the main league system.

|-
!colspan="3" align="center"|5 June

|-
!colspan="3" align="center"|6 June

|-
!colspan="3" align="center"|10 June

|-
!colspan="3" align="center"|12 June

|-
!colspan="3" align="center"|19 June

|-
!colspan="3" align="center"|20 June

|-
!colspan="3" align="center"|21 June

|-
!colspan="3" align="center"|26 June

|-
!colspan="3" align="center"|1 July

|-
!colspan="3" align="center"|2 July

|-
!colspan="3" align="center"|4 July

|-
!colspan="3" align="center"|6 July

|-
!colspan="3" align="center"|11 July

Notes
Note 1: JK Leisi withdrew from the competition.
Note 2: SK Tääksi withdrew from the competition.
Note 3: Tartu JK Tammeka II withdrew from the competition.
Note 4: Kohtla-Järve FC Lootus won the match 4–1, but used a suspended player. Therefore, the match was awarded -:1 to FC Puuma.

Byes
These teams were not drawn and secured a place in the second round without playing:
 Meistriliiga (Level 1): Narva JK Trans, JK Sillamäe Kalev, Paide Linnameeskond
 Esiliiga (2): Rakvere JK Tarvas
 II Liiga (3): Paide Kumake, Keila JK, FC Nõmme United
 III Liiga (4): Põlva FC Lootos, Koeru JK, Saaremaa JK, Valga FC Warrior, JK Welco Elekter
 IV Liiga (5): Viimsi MRJK, Taebla JK, FC Pubi Trehv, Tartu Quattromed II

Second round
The draw for the second round was made on 27 June.

|-
!colspan="3" align="center"|11 July

|-
!colspan="3" align="center"|13 July

|-
!colspan="3" align="center"|17 July

|-
!colspan="3" align="center"|18 July

|-
!colspan="3" align="center"|19 July

|-
!colspan="3" align="center"|22 July

|-
!colspan="3" align="center"|24 July

|-
!colspan="3" align="center"|25 July

|-
!colspan="3" align="center"|30 July

|-
!colspan="3" align="center"|31 July

|-
!colspan="3" align="center"|7 August

|-
!colspan="3" align="center"|8 August

|-
!colspan="3" align="center"|14 August

|-
!colspan="3" align="center"|15 August

Third round
The draw for the third round was made on 2 August.  Provisional match dates are between 21 and 31 August.

|-
!colspan="3" align="center"|21 August

|-
!colspan="3" align="center"|22 August

|-
!colspan="3" align="center"|28 August

|-
!colspan="3" align="center"|4 September

|-
!colspan="3" align="center"|5 September

|-
!colspan="3" align="center"|9 September

|-
!colspan="3" align="center"|12 September

Notes
Note 5: Saaremaa JK withdrew from the competition.
Note 6: Kuusalu JK Rada withdrew from the competition.

Fourth round
The draw for the fourth round was made on 23 August.

|-
!colspan="3" align="center"|25 September

|-
!colspan="3" align="center"|10 October

|-
!colspan="3" align="center"|13 October

|-
!colspan="3" align="center"|24 October

Quarter-finals
The draw was made on 28 February 2013, at the opening of new league season. Tammeka got bye to the semi-finals as the eighth quarter-finalist, Viljandi, was disbanded after the 2012 league season.

Semi-finals
The draw was made on 18 April 2013.

Final

Top goalscorers

References

External links
 Official website 

Estonian Cup seasons
Cup
Cup
Estonian